Trellius is an Asian genus of crickets (Orthoptera: Ensifera) in the family Phalangopsidae, subfamily Phaloriinae, tribe Phaloriini.  

Species can be found in southern China, Indo-China and Malesia.

Species
The Orthoptera Species File lists:
 subgenus Diatrellius Gorochov, 2003
Trellius abbreviates Gorochov, 2003
 subgenus Neotrellius Gorochov, 1992
Trellius logunovi Gorochov, 2018
Trellius simulator Gorochov, 2018
Trellius tonkinensis (Chopard, 1925)
Trellius yunnanensis Ma & Jing, 2018
 subgenus Protrellius Gorochov, 1996
Trellius aequatorialis Gorochov, 2003
Trellius barisan Gorochov, 2010
Trellius buqueti (Serville, 1838)
Trellius curup Gorochov, 2010
Trellius dulcis Gorochov, 1996
Trellius duplicatus Gorochov, 1999
Trellius electus Gorochov, 1999
Trellius elenae Gorochov, 2011
Trellius helverseni (Heller, 1985)
Trellius kerinci Gorochov, 2003
Trellius lampung Gorochov, 2010
Trellius michaili Gorochov, 2011
Trellius neesoon Gorochov & Tan, 2012
Trellius palawani Gorochov, 2004
Trellius perbonus Gorochov, 1999
Trellius siveci Gorochov, 1996
Trellius suspectus Gorochov, 1999
 subgenus Trellius Gorochov, 1988
Trellius alius Gorochov, 1992
Trellius certus Gorochov, 1992
Trellius deminutus Gorochov, 1990
Trellius detersus Gorochov, 1999
Trellius guangdongensis Ma & Jing, 2018
Trellius inquisitor Gorochov, 2010
Trellius jacobsoni (Chopard, 1925)
Trellius lithophilus Gorochov, 1990
Trellius orlovi Gorochov, 1999
Trellius riparius Gorochov, 1990
Trellius verus Gorochov, 1992
Trellius vitalisi (Chopard, 1925) – type species:  as Heterotrypus vitalisi Chopard
 subgenus Vescelotrellius Gorochov, 1999
Trellius excellens Gorochov, 1999
Trellius fallens Gorochov, 1999
 subgenus Zatrellius Gorochov, 1999
Trellius andamanensis Gorochov, 2003
Trellius communis Gorochov, 1999
Trellius crocker Gorochov, 2018
Trellius kinabalu Gorochov, 2018
Trellius tawau Gorochov, 2018

References

External links
 

Ensifera genera
crickets
Orthoptera of Asia